The All-Ireland Senior Hurling Championship 1910 was the 24th series of the All-Ireland Senior Hurling Championship, Ireland's premier hurling knock-out competition.  Wexford won the championship, beating Limerick 7-0 to 6-2 in the final.

Format

All-Ireland Championship

Quarter-finals: (2 matches) These are two lone matches that see the Leinster representatives play London and the Ulster representatives play Glasgow.  Two teams are eliminated at this stage while the two winning teams advance to the semi-finals.

Semi-finals: (2 matches) The two winning teams from the quarter-finals join the Connacht and Munster representatives to make up the semi-final pairings.  The two quarter-final-winning teams play in one semi-final while the second semi-final is a Connacht-Munster game.  Two teams are eliminated at this stage while the two winning teams advance to the All-Ireland final.

Final: (1 match) The winners of the two semi-finals contest this game with the winners being declared All-Ireland champions.

Results

Leinster Senior Hurling Championship

Semi-finals

Final

Munster Senior Hurling Championship

First round

Semi-finals

Final

Ulster Senior Hurling Championship

Final

All-Ireland Senior Hurling Championship

Quarter-finals

Semi-finals

Final

Championship statistics

Miscellaneous

 Three Leinster teams represented the province in the All-Ireland series of games. Kilkenny, as reigning All-Ireland champions, were nominated to represent Leinster in the All-Ireland quarter-final against Antrim. Dublin represented Leinster in the All-Ireland semi-final against Glasgow as they had earlier defeated reigning champions Kilkenny in the provincial semi-final. Wexford were the Leinster representatives in the All-Ireland final as they had earlier defeated Dublin to claim the provincial title.
 Two Munster teams represented the province in the All-Ireland series of games. Cork were nominated to represent Munster in the All-Ireland semi-final against Galway. They were subsequently defeated by Limerick in the Munster semi-final who represented the province in the All-Ireland final.

References

Sources

 Corry, Eoghan, The GAA Book of Lists (Hodder Headline Ireland, 2005).
 Donegan, Des, The Complete Handbook of Gaelic Games (DBA Publications Limited, 2005).
 Fullam, Brendan, Captains of the Ash (Wolfhound Press, 2002).

1910